Breckinridge is a town in Garfield County, Oklahoma, United States. The population was 245 at the 2010 census.

Geography
Breckinridge is located at  (36.448316, -97.726935).

Demographics

As of the census of 2000, there were 239 people, 94 households, and 73 families residing in the town. The population density was 15.8 people per square mile (6.1/km2). There were 106 housing units at an average density of 7.0 per square mile (2.7/km2). The racial makeup of the town was 92.89% White, 2.93% Native American, 1.67% from other races, and 2.51% from two or more races. Hispanic or Latino of any race were 2.09% of the population.

There were 94 households, out of which 33.0% had children under the age of 18 living with them, 68.1% were married couples living together, 7.4% had a female householder with no husband present, and 22.3% were non-families. 21.3% of all households were made up of individuals, and 9.6% had someone living alone who was 65 years of age or older. The average household size was 2.54 and the average family size was 2.95.

In the town, the population was spread out, with 25.9% under the age of 18, 5.0% from 18 to 24, 29.3% from 25 to 44, 27.6% from 45 to 64, and 12.1% who were 65 years of age or older. The median age was 40 years. For every 100 females, there were 97.5 males. For every 100 females age 18 and over, there were 94.5 males.

The median income for a household in the town was $35,000, and the median income for a family was $43,125. Males had a median income of $33,333 versus $23,125 for females. The per capita income for the town was $15,580. About 10.7% of families and 14.4% of the population were below the poverty line, including 22.6% of those under the age of eighteen and 4.3% of those 65 or over.

Education
Most of Breckenridge is in the Garber Public Schools school district. A portion in the northeast is within Kremlin-Hillsdale Schools.

References

External links
 Encyclopedia of Oklahoma History and Culture - Breckinridge

Towns in Garfield County, Oklahoma
Towns in Oklahoma